The Senkata and Sacaba massacres were two incidents of political violence in Bolivia under the presidency of Jeanine Áñez:
 Sacaba massacre on November 15, 2019
 Senkata massacre on November 19, 2019 

2019 in Bolivia
Democratic socialism in South America
Massacres in 2019
Massacres in Bolivia
Movement for Socialism (Bolivia)
2019 crimes in Bolivia